César Ramírez (born January 25, 1990) nicknamed "el Tiburón" ("the Shark"), is a tennis player from Mexico. He played for the Mexican Davis Cup squad in 2012.

Ramírez tested positive for steroids and has been suspended from competition for four years, until 12 April 2022.

ATP Challenger and ITF Futures finals

Singles: 14 (8–6)

Doubles: 29 (18–11)

Junior Grand Slam finals

Doubles: 1 (1 runner-up)

References

Sources

Living people
1990 births
Mexican male tennis players
Sportspeople from Veracruz
Tennis players at the 2011 Pan American Games
Pan American Games competitors for Mexico
Central American and Caribbean Games silver medalists for Mexico
Doping cases in tennis
Competitors at the 2014 Central American and Caribbean Games
Central American and Caribbean Games medalists in tennis
21st-century Mexican people